State Highway 55 (SH 55) is a state highway in the U.S. state of Texas. It runs from Uvalde northwestward through the western Hill Country onto the Edwards Plateau, ending south of Sonora.

History

SH 55 was designated from Rocksprings to La Pryor on August 21, 1923, replacing SH 3E and a portion of SH 4. On March 16, 1925, it extended south to SH 2 near Cactus. On October 26, 1926, it was rerouted to Bart. On October 10, 1927, it extended south through Catarina and then east to Artesia Wells. On August 6, 1929 (effective on September 1), SH 55 was truncated to Uvalde, with everything south of there being transferred to SH 4, and the section from Catarina to Artesia Wells was cancelled in exchange for the extension of SH 4. On October 25, 1932, SH 55 extended north to its current terminus. On November 30, 1932, SH 55 was extended south through Batesville and Dilley to San Diego. On July 15, 1935, SH 55 was shortened to a route from Rocksprings to Uvalde. On January 18, 1937, SH 55 extended to Dilley again. On February 11, 1937, SH 55 extended back north to SH 30. The portion from Uvalde to 4.8 miles southeast of Batesville and from Divot to Dilley were to be constructed starting on March 26, 1942, but upon completion, these sections of SH 55 were to be cancelled and changed to Farm to Market Roads. The section south of Uvalde was cancelled on January 11, 1945, and the portion from Uvalde to 4.8 miles south of Batesville was transferred to FM 117. The section from Dilley to Divot was still under construction, but changed to FM 471 on July 9, 1945.

Junction list

References 

055
Transportation in Uvalde County, Texas
Transportation in Real County, Texas
Transportation in Edwards County, Texas